Liu Mei ( 962 –  1021, courtesy name Shiji), born Gong Mei, was a Song dynasty official and general. Originally a silversmith, he rose to power after his protégé (possibly even wife) Lady Liu, whom he sold in poverty, became an empress. Because Empress Liu had no non-marital relatives, she claimed him as her brother. Liu Mei rose as high as Inspector in Chief of the Metropolitan Cavalry Command, and married a granddaughter of the Wuyue king Qian Chu.

References

960s births
1021 deaths
Silversmiths
Song dynasty generals